Petrobras Headquarters is a brutalist office building used by Petrobras in the Centro neighbourhood of Rio de Janeiro, Brazil. The 108-metre, 29-storey building was constructed from 1967 to 1972. The building's architect was Roberto Luís Gandolfi.

The building's top floor caught fire on 19 May 2004, destroying the communications room.

H
Buildings and structures in Rio de Janeiro (city)
Headquarters in Brazil
Buildings and structures completed in 1972
1972 establishments in Brazil
Modernist architecture in Brazil